Stéphane Brochu (born August 15, 1967) is a Canadian former ice hockey defenceman.

Biography
Brochu was born in Sherbrooke, Quebec. As a youth, he played in the 1979 and 1980 Quebec International Pee-Wee Hockey Tournaments with a minor ice hockey team from Sherbrooke.

Brochu was drafted 175th overall by the New York Rangers in the 1985 NHL Entry Draft from the Quebec Major Junior Hockey League's Quebec Remparts. He played three further seasons in the league for the Saint-Jean Castors before turning pro in the International Hockey League for the Colorado Rangers who later became the Denver Rangers.  

During the 1988-89 season, Brochu was called up for one game for the New York Rangers.  This turned out to be Brochu's only NHL game.  After five games with the Flint Spirits, Brochu spent two seasons with the Fort Wayne Komets before returning to Flint in 1991 to suit up for the Flint Bulldogs of the Colonial Hockey League. He also played 3 games for the IHL's Kansas City Blades. Brochu remained in Flint and signed with the Flint Generals where he spent six seasons.  During the six seasons, he had spells in the IHL for the Detroit Vipers, Chicago Wolves and the Fort Wayne Koments as well as the American Hockey League's Adirondack Red Wings. After spending the 1999-00 season with the Adirondack IceHawks, Brochu returned to the Generals for one more season before retiring.

Career statistics

See also
List of players who played only one game in the NHL

References

External links
 

1967 births
Adirondack IceHawks players
Adirondack Red Wings players
Canadian ice hockey defencemen
Chicago Wolves (IHL) players
Colorado Rangers players
Denver Rangers players
Detroit Vipers players
Flint Bulldogs players
Flint Generals (CoHL) players
Flint Spirits players
Fort Wayne Komets players
French Quebecers
Sportspeople from Sherbrooke
Kansas City Blades players
Living people
New York Rangers draft picks
New York Rangers players
Quebec Remparts players
Saint-Jean Castors players
Ice hockey people from Quebec